Lesbian, gay, bisexual, transgender (LGBT) affirming denominations in Judaism (also called gay-affirming) are Jewish religious groups that welcome LGBT members and do not consider homosexuality to be a sin.  They include both entire Jewish denominations, as well as individual synagogues. Some are composed mainly of non-LGBT members and also have specific programs to welcome LGBT people, while others are composed mainly of LGBT members.

Denominations

Conservative Judaism - (Mixed support)
Reform Judaism
Reconstructionist Judaism
Jewish Renewal
Humanistic Judaism

Individual congregations
First Narayever Congregation (Toronto, Ontario, Canada)
Bet Mishpachah (Washington, D.C.)
Fabrangen Havurah (Washington, D.C.)
Sha'ar Zahav (San Francisco, California)
Congregation Beit Simchat Torah (New York, New York)
Congregation Bet Haverim (Atlanta, Georgia)
Temple Israel (Ottawa, Ontario, Canada)
Makom: Creative Downtown Judaism (Toronto, Ontario, Canada)

Denomination-sanctioned programmes
 Institute for Judaism and Sexual Orientation - Reform Judaism

Unofficial programmes

 Keshet Rabbis - Conservative Judaism
 KOACH College Outreach - Conservative Judaism
 Kirtzono - Orthodox Judaism
 Hod - Orthodox Judaism
 Bat Kol - Orthodox Judaism
 Orthodykes - Orthodox Judaism

Programmes not affiliated with any particular denomination

 Keshet
 Jewish Mosaic
Nehirim
GayGevalt LGBT Jewish Calendar
Havruta- Religious Gays
Gay Youth
Kamoha
Israel AIDS Taskforce
GLBT Outreach & Engagement (GLOE)
Hoshen
Aguda - The Israeli National LGBT Task Force
Eshel
The Jerusalem Open House
Tehila
Kulanu Toronto
Jewish Queer Youth
A Wider Bridge
Jewish Transitions
Jewish Lesbian Group of Victoria
The Rainbow Center
International Association of Lesbian & Gay Children of Holocaust Survivors (IALGCHS)
Jewish Gay and Lesbian Group (JGLG) [United Kingdom]
Shalom Amigos (Mexico)
Keshet Deutschland (Germany)
Yachad (Germany)
Dayenu (Australia)
Aleph (Australia)
Beit Haverim (France)
JQ International

See also

Sexuality and Judaism
Homosexuality and Judaism
Timeline of LGBT Jewish history
LGBT clergy in Judaism
Same-sex marriage and Judaism
Transgender people and Judaism
 LGBT rights in Israel
 Jewish LGBT organizations
 List of LGBT Jews

References

External links
 Institute for Judaism and Sexual Orientation of Hebrew Union College (Reform Judaism)
 Jewish, Bisexual, Feminist in a Christian Heterosexual World: Oy Vey!, by Sari H. Dworkin, Ph.D.

LGBT and Judaism